Rocky Island may refer to:

Australia
 Rocky Island (Queensland), in Walsh Bay, Queensland, Australia
 Rocky Point Island (Queensland), in Walsh Bay, Queensland, Australia

South China Sea 
 Rocky Island, South China Sea, one of the Paracel Islands in the South China Sea (under the administration of the People's Republic of China. Vietnam also claims sovereignty)

Egypt
 Rocky Island (Egypt), in Foul Bay on the Egyptian coast of the Red Sea

Ireland
 Rocky Island (Cork), in Cork Harbour, County Cork, Republic of Ireland
 Rocky Island, County Fermanagh, a townland in County Fermanagh, Northern Ireland

Tuvalu
 Rocky Island, a former name of Niulakita

United States
 Rocky Island, a former name of Brooks Island in Richmond, California, in the San Francisco Bay
 Rocky Island (Wisconsin), one of the Apostle Islands in Lake Superior
 Rocky Island (Michigan), in Lake Michigan south of the Garden Peninsula

See also 
 Rock Island (disambiguation)